Alright Already is an American sitcom television series created and starring by Carol Leifer, that aired on The WB from September 7, 1997, to May 4, 1998.

Premise
A single businesswoman opens an optometry shop in Miami with her best friend and deals with embarrassing situations and her relationship with her family.

Cast
Carol Leifer as Carol Lerner
Amy Yasbeck as Renee
Stacy Galina as Jessica Lerner
Mitzi McCall as Miriam Lerner
Maury Sterling as Vaughn Lerner
Jerry Adler as Al Lerner

Episodes

References

External links

1990s American sitcoms
1997 American television series debuts
1998 American television series endings
English-language television shows
Television shows set in Miami
The WB original programming
Latino sitcoms